Ewald Georg von Kleist (c. 1700–1748), also known as Ewald Jürgen von Kleist, was the inventor of the Leyden jar.

A member of the von Kleist family, Ewald was born in Wicewo in Farther Pomerania. His father was district administrator  (1657–1716). He studied jurisprudence at the University of Leipzig and the University of Leyden and may have started his interest in electricity at the latter university under the influence of Willem 's Gravesande. He was a member of the Academy of Sciences in Berlin.

On 11 October 1745 he independently invented the Kleistian jar, which could store electricity in large quantities. He communicated this discovery to a group of Berlin scientists in late 1745, and the news was transferred in a confused form to Leyden University where it was further investigated. This became more commonly known as the Leyden jar after  graduate student Pieter van Musschenbroek of Leyden.

References

1700 births
1748 deaths
People from Tychowo
18th-century German lawyers
18th-century German inventors
Deans (Christianity)
18th-century German Lutheran clergy
18th-century German physicists
Ewald Georg
People from the Province of Pomerania
Leipzig University alumni
Leiden University alumni